The Union Danese pro Interlingua (Danish: Dansk Interlingua Union, DIU), the oldest of the Nordic Interlingua organizations, was established on November 7, 1960 – four years before the Swedish Society for Interlingua. The DIU promotes and provides for the teaching of Interlingua in Denmark and in Nordic countries such as Iceland, which do not yet have official Interlingua representation. It maintains a publishing program and, in collaboration with the Swedish, Norwegian, and Finnish Interlingua organizations, has produced the magazine Actualitates – Interlingua i Norden since 1960.

The DIU was an outgrowth of the earlier Interlingua Service, founded in Odense by Bent Andersen. The driving force behind the establishment of the DIU was writer Hans Neerbek. Other important influences were Jørgen Kofod-Jensen and Jørgen Michelsen.

References

Panorama in Interlingua, 2005, Issue 6.

External links
Actualitates – le ligamine parve ma perseverante, Historia de Interlingua: Communication Sin Frontieras, 2001, Revised 2006.
Portrait del organisationes de interlingua, Historia de Interlingua: Communication Sin Frontieras, 2001, Revised 2006.

Danish